The Pochonbo Electronic Ensemble is an orchestra from North Korea. It is famous for its performances of revolutionary and folk songs. They have been reported to be one of the country's most popular groups. 

The group takes its name from the Battle of Pochonbo on 4 June 1937, when a guerrilla unit under the leadership of Kim Il-sung attacked compounds of the Japanese occupation force in Pochonbo. The group was formed on June 4th, 1985 from the electronic music section of the Mansudae Art Troupe. The group is the first electronic pop group in the country.

The Pochonbo Electronic Ensemble can be heard on North Korean radio stations. A total of 182 volumes (186 CDs) were released (due to rerelease of volumes 13-16 in the 1990s).

Known members

Hyon Song-wol - vocals (Merited Actress)
Ri Kyong-suk - vocals (Merited Actress)
Kim Kwang-suk (1964-2018) - vocals (People's Actress)
Ri Pun-hui - vocals (Merited Actress)
Jo Gum-hwa - vocals (Merited Actress)
Chon Hye-young - vocals (People's Actress)
Kim Jong-nyo - vocals
Yun Hye-young - vocals
Kim Won-il (Edited out from concerts re-released around 2009, and not mentioned as a member since then) - synthesizers (People's Actor)
Kim Hae-song - synthesizers (Merited Actor)
Kim Mun-hyok - synthesizers (Merited Actor)
Kwon Kyong-hak - synthesizers
Kim Song-ryop - synthesizers
Jon Kwon - piano (People's Artist)
Jang Jong-won - piano
Ri Mun - electronic organ
Kang Chol-ho - electronic organ (Merited Actor)
Kang Gum-chol - electronic organ
Park Ui-hyon - guitar
Song Kwang - guitar (Merited Actor)
Choe Yong-chol - guitar (Merited Actor)
Kim Yong-il - bass guitar
Choe Mun-chol - drums (Merited Actor)
Kim Jin (missing from footage filmed 2015, status as a member is unknown) - percussion (Merited Actor)
Kim Yeon-su - conductor (Merited Artist)
Ri Jong-o (1943-2016) - conductor, major composer (People's Artist, Labour Hero, Kim Il Sung Order and Kim Il Sung Prize Winner)

See also

 List of North Korean musicians
Music of North Korea
 Music of Korea
 Unhasu Orchestra
 Wangjaesan Light Music Band

References 

1985 establishments in North Korea
2010s disestablishments in North Korea
North Korean orchestras
Electronic music groups
Disbanded orchestras
North Korean musical groups
Musical groups established in 1985
Musical groups disestablished in the 2010s